The Kazym is a river in Beloyarsky District, Khanty-Mansi Autonomous Okrug, Russia.

The town of Beloyarsky is along the Kazym.

Course
The Kazym is a right tributary of the Ob. Its sources are in the Siberian Uvaly. It flows through the northern part of the West Siberian Plain meandering across a very swampy valley. There are numerous lakes in its basin, including the relatively large Sorum-Lor and the Saran-Kho-Lor. The Kazym river is fed mainly by snow. It freezes in early November and begins to thaw in late May.

Tributaries  

See also
List of rivers of Russia

References

Rivers of Khanty-Mansi Autonomous Okrug
West Siberian Plain